John Teasdale may refer to:
John Teasdale (wheat farmer) (1881–1962), chairman of the Australian Wheat Board
John D. Teasdale, brain sciences researcher
John Teasdale (footballer) (born 1962), Scottish footballer